Polochaninov Volodymyr (April 25, 1974) is a Ukrainian politician who is a former people's deputy.

Personal life
He is married with two children.

References 

1974 births
Seventh convocation members of the Verkhovna Rada
Living people